Fakirerpool Young Men's Club is a football team from Dhaka, Bangladesh. It is currently a team of Bangladesh Championship League (BCL).

History

Players
Fakirerpool Young Men's Club squad for 2022–23 season.

Team records

Head coach

Personnel

Current technical staff

Honours
Dhaka League
Winner (2): 2007–08, 2010
Dhaka First Division League
Winner (2): 1993, 2003–04
Runners-up: 2000

References

Football clubs in Bangladesh
Sport in Dhaka